Jérémy Baffour Doku (born 27 May 2002) is a Belgian professional footballer who plays as a forward for Ligue 1 club Rennes and the Belgium national team.

Club career

Anderlecht 
Doku began playing football at a young age in Antwerp for KVC Olympic Deurne and Tubantia Borgerhout, then he played for Beerschot. Later on, he moved to R.S.C. Anderlecht in 2012 at the age of 10. He made his professional debut with Anderlecht in a 4–2 Belgian First Division A loss to Sint-Truiden on 25 November 2018, at the age of 16.

Rennes 
On 5 October 2020, Doku signed for Rennes for five years, for €26 million in addition to bonuses.

International career
Doku was born in Belgium and is of Ghanaian descent. Doku represented the Belgium U17s at the 2018 UEFA European Under-17 Championship.

He made his first appearance for the Belgium national team on 5 September 2020 against Denmark in the UEFA Nations League. Three days later, he scored his first goal for the Belgium national team in a 5–1 win against Iceland.

In the UEFA Euro 2020, held in June 2021, Doku was one of the substitutes for the Belgium national team in their group stage match against Denmark, and was included in the starting line-up for the subsequent game against Finland; he was again named to the starting 11 for Belgium's quarter-final loss against Italy. 

In November 2022, Doku was called up to the Belgium squad that would compete for the 2022 FIFA World Cup held in Qatar by manager Roberto Martinez.

Career statistics

Club

International

Scores and results list Belgium's goal tally first, score column indicates score after each Doku goal.

References

External links
 
 UEFA Youth League Profile
 

Living people
2002 births
Footballers from Antwerp
Association football forwards
Belgian footballers
Belgium international footballers
Belgium under-21 international footballers
Belgium youth international footballers
Black Belgian sportspeople
Belgian people of Ghanaian descent
R.S.C. Anderlecht players
Belgian Pro League players
Stade Rennais F.C. players
Ligue 1 players
UEFA Euro 2020 players
2022 FIFA World Cup players
Belgian expatriate footballers
Expatriate footballers in France
Belgian expatriate sportspeople in France